The Scam Artist was a 2004 independent film that was meant to catapult the acting career of Kimberly Page.

The movie stars Kimberly Page, her then husband Diamond Dallas Page and Michael Patrick Larson. The plot was  set in the future in the United States. Corporations rule America and the daughter of a wealthy CEO, Sylvia Heinrich (Kimberly Page), cooks up a scheme with her boyfriend, David Sands (Larson), to fake her kidnapping and to leave the country with the ransom money.

They involve a mercenary, Lenny (Diamond Dallas Page) to assist but then things start to go haywire and greed begins to rear its ugly head.   Sylvia's father, Winston (Tim McNally) does not want to pay a ransom and adds his thugs to the mix.

External links

Official Site
Production Company

American science fiction action films
2004 films
2004 independent films
2004 science fiction action films
American independent films
2000s English-language films
2000s American films